The Alabama Penny Savings Bank is a historic building built in 1913 at 310 18th Street North in Birmingham, Alabama, United States. It has also been known as the Pythian Temple. It was listed on the National Register of Historic Places in 1980.

It is a six-story Commercial style building with a buff-colored brick exterior. "It has a strong vertical appearance, emphasized by its proportions and the unbroken rise of four vertical piers."  It has a projecting cornice.

It is significant as the building of the first black-owned bank in Alabama, which financed construction of homes and churches for thousands of local black citizens.  The bank was founded in 1890 and was the second largest black bank in the United States in 1907.

It is also significant as "a distinctive local example of 1910s office building design". It was built by a local black construction company and may have been designed by black architect Wallace A. Rayfield, who designed many other buildings for the black community in Birmingham.

It is also a contributing building in the Fourth Avenue Historic District.

References

Knights of Pythias buildings
National Register of Historic Places in Birmingham, Alabama
Buildings and structures completed in 1913